Kokane Presents The Hood Mob is the only studio album by American hip hop group The Hood Mob, consisted of Kokane, Contraband and Cricet. It was released on March 21, 2006 via Siccness.net.

Track listing
"Intro"
"Invasion of the Body Snatchers"
"Killa Cali" feat. Complex
"From da Hood" feat. Bay Loc & Cutthroat
"Skit"
"It's On, on Sight"
"Mission Impossible" Skit
"Get At You"
"The Robbery"
"Momma" feat. Mitchy Slick
"The Gutter" feat. Eclipse & Steve Vicious
"The Black Hole" feat. Damu
"I Can Understand It"
"Push"
"Take Yo Panties Off"
"My Life"
"The Hood Mob, Pt. 2"
"Zoo"
"Outro"

References

2006 albums
Kokane albums